Jessica Becker is the fourth ranked top female bodyboarder in the world. The Brazilian bodyboarder won the Wood Bodyboard Champion Girls Experience European tour in 2015.

References

Year of birth missing (living people)
Living people
Bodyboarders
Brazilian surfers